The United States Society on Dams is a professional association headquartered in Westminster, Colorado that is dedicated to:
 Advancing the knowledge of dam engineering, construction, planning, operation, performance, rehabilitation, decommissioning, maintenance, security and safety;
 Fostering dam technology for socially, environmentally and financially sustainable water resources systems;
 Providing public awareness of the role of dams in the management of the nation's water resources;
 Enhancing practices to meet current and future challenges on dams; and
 Representing the United States as an active member of the International Commission on Large Dams (ICOLD).

References

External links
 

American engineering organizations
Dam-related organizations
Dams in the United States
Organizations with year of establishment missing
Organizations based in Denver